STS-97 was a Space Shuttle mission to the International Space Station (ISS) flown by Space Shuttle  Endeavour. The crew installed the first set of solar arrays to the ISS, prepared a docking port for arrival of the Destiny Laboratory Module, and delivered supplies for the station's crew. It was the last human spaceflight of the 20th century.

Crew

Spacewalks
 Tanner and Noriega  – EVA 1
EVA 1 Start: 3 December 2000 – 18:35 UTC
EVA 1 End: 4 December 2000 – 02:08 UTC
Duration: 7 hours, 33 minutes
 Tanner and Noriega  – EVA 2
EVA 2 Start: 5 December 2000 – 17:21 UTC
EVA 2 End: 5 December 2000 – 23:58 UTC
Duration: 6 hours, 37 minutes
 Tanner and Noriega  – EVA 3
EVA 3 Start: 7 December 2000 – 16:13 UTC
EVA 3 End: 7 December 2000 – 21:23 UTC
Duration: 5 hours, 10 minutes

Mission highlights

During the 11-day mission, the primary objective was completed, which was to deliver and connect the first set of U.S.-provided solar arrays and the P6 Truss to the International Space Station. The astronauts completed three spacewalks, during which they prepared a docking port for arrival of the Destiny Laboratory Module, installed Floating Potential Probes to measure electrical potential surrounding the station, installed a camera cable outside the Unity Module, and transferred supplies, equipment and refuse between Endeavour and the station.

The successful checkout of the Extravehicular Mobility Units (EMUs), the Simplified Aid For EVA Rescue (SAFER) units, the Canadarm (RMS), the Orbiter Space Vision System (OSVS) and the Orbiter Docking System (ODS) were all completed nominally. Also, the ODS centerline camera was installed with no misalignment noted.

From inside Endeavour, Canadian Mission Specialist Marc Garneau used the Canadarm to remove the 8 ton stainless steel P6 truss from the payload bay, maneuvering it into an overnight park position to warm its components. Mission Specialists Joseph Tanner and Carlos Noriega moved through Endeavour'''s docking tunnel and opened the hatch to the ISS docking port to leave supplies and computer hardware on the doorstep of the Station. On flight day 4, the Expedition 1 Commander William Shepherd, Pilot Yuri Gidzenko and Flight Engineer Sergei Krikalev – entered the Unity Module for the first time and retrieved the items left for them.

At 09:36 EST on 8 December 2000, the crew paid the first visit to the Expedition 1 crew residing in the space station. Until then the shuttle and the station had kept one hatch closed to maintain respective atmospheric pressures, allowing the shuttle crew to conduct their spacewalks and mission goals. After a welcome ceremony and briefing, the eight spacefarers conducted structural tests of the station and its solar arrays, transferred equipment, supplies and refuse back and forth between the spacecraft, and checked out the television camera cable installed by Tanner and Noriega for the upcoming mission.

On 9 December 2000, the two crews completed final transfers of supplies to the station and other items being returned to Earth. The Endeavour crew bade farewell to the Expedition 1 crew at 10:51 EST and closed the hatches between the spacecraft. After being docked together for 6 days, 23 hours and 13 minutes, Endeavour undocked from the station at 14:13 EST. Piloted by Michael Bloomfield, it then made an hour-long, tail-first circle of the station. The undocking took place 235 statute miles above the border of Kazakhstan and China. The final separation burn took place near the northeast coast of South America.

STS-97 was the 15th flight of Endeavour'' and the 101st Space Shuttle mission.

Wake-up calls 
NASA began a tradition of playing music to astronauts during the Gemini program, which was first used to wake up a flight crew during Apollo 15.
Each track is specially chosen, often by their families, and usually has a special meaning to an individual member of the crew, or is applicable to their daily activities.

Images

See also

List of human spaceflights
List of International Space Station spacewalks
List of Space Shuttle missions
List of spacewalks and moonwalks 1965–1999
Outline of space science

References

External links
 NASA mission summary 
 STS-97 Video Highlights 

Spacecraft launched in 2000
2000 in the United States
STS-097
2000 in Florida